In the mathematical area of group theory, the Grigorchuk group or the first Grigorchuk group is a finitely generated group constructed by Rostislav Grigorchuk that provided the first example of a finitely generated group of intermediate (that is, faster than polynomial but slower than exponential) growth. The group was originally constructed by Grigorchuk in a 1980 paper and he then proved in a 1984 paper that this group has intermediate growth, thus providing an answer to an important open problem posed by John Milnor in 1968. The Grigorchuk group remains a key object of study in geometric group theory, particularly in the study of the so-called branch groups and automata groups, and it has important connections with the theory of iterated monodromy groups.

History and significance

The study of growth rates of finitely generated groups goes back to the 1950s and is motivated in part by the notion of volume entropy (that is, the growth rate of the volume of balls) in the universal covering space of a compact Riemannian manifold in differential geometry. It is obvious that the growth rate of a finitely generated group is at most exponential and it was also understood early on that finitely generated nilpotent groups have polynomial growth. In 1968 John Milnor posed a question about the existence of a finitely generated group of intermediate growth, that is, faster than any polynomial function and slower than any exponential function. An important result in the subject is Gromov's theorem on groups of polynomial growth, obtained by Gromov in 1981, which shows that a finitely generated group has polynomial growth if and only if this group has a nilpotent subgroup of finite index. Prior to Grigorchuk's work, there were many results establishing growth dichotomy (that is, that the growth is always either polynomial or exponential) for various classes of finitely generated groups, such as linear groups, solvable groups, etc.

Grigorchuk's group G was constructed in a 1980 paper of Rostislav Grigorchuk, where he proved that this group is infinite, periodic and residually finite. In a subsequent 1984 paper Grigorchuk proved that this group has intermediate growth (this result was announced by Grigorchuk in 1983). More precisely, he proved that G has growth b(n) that is faster than  but slower than  where . The upper bound was later improved by Laurent Bartholdi to

The precise asymptotics of the growth of G is still unknown. It is conjectured that the limit

exists but even this remained a major open problem. This problem was resolved in 2020 by Erschler and Zheng. They show that the limit equals .

Grigorchuk's group was also the first example of a group that is amenable but not elementary amenable, thus answering a problem posed by Mahlon Marsh Day in 1957.

Originally, Grigorchuk's group G was constructed as a group of Lebesgue-measure-preserving transformations on the unit interval, but subsequently simpler descriptions of G were found and it is now usually presented as a group of automorphisms of the infinite regular binary rooted tree. The study of Grigorchuk's group informed in large part the development of the theory of branch groups, automata groups and self-similar groups in the 1990s–2000s and Grigorchuk's group remains a central object in this theory. Recently important connections between this theory and complex dynamics, particularly the notion of iterated monodromy groups, have been uncovered in the work of Volodymyr Nekrashevych. and others.

After Grigorchuk's 1984 paper, there were many subsequent extensions and generalizations.

Definition

Although initially the Grigorchuk group was defined as a group of Lebesgue measure-preserving transformations of the unit interval, at present this group is usually given by its realization as a group of automorphisms of the infinite regular binary rooted tree T2.  The tree T2 is realized as the set  of all finite strings in the alphabet  plus the empty string  which is the root vertex of T2. For a vertex x of T2 the string x0 is the left child of x and the string x1 is the right child of x in T2. The group of all automorphisms Aut(T2) can thus be thought of as the group of all length-preserving permutations σ of  that also respect the initial segment relation, that is such that whenever a string x is an initial segment of a string y then σ(x) is an initial segment of σ(y).

The Grigorchuk group G is then defined as the subgroup of Aut(T2) generated by four specific elements of Aut(T2):

where the automorphisms a, b, c, d are defined as follows (note that  is fixed by all automorphisms of the tree):

We see that only the element a is defined explicitly and the elements b, c, d are defined recursively. To get a better picture of this action we note that  has a natural gradation into levels given by the length of the strings:

Now let  denote the union of all vertices with level  This means:

With this notation we see that:

Now we can also write the action of the elements b, c and d in terms of the disjoint union as follows:

Similarly we have:

Properties

The following are basic algebraic properties of the Grigorchuk group (see for proofs):

The group G is infinite.
The group G is residually finite. Let  be the restriction homomorphism that sends every element of G to its restriction to the finite tree T[n]. The groups Aut(T[n]) are finite and for every nontrivial g in G there exists n such that 
The group G is generated by a and any two of the three elements b,c,d. For example, we can write 
The elements a, b, c, d are involutions.
The elements b, c, d pairwise commute and bc = cb = d, bd = db = c, dc = cd = b, so that  is an abelian group of order 4 isomorphic to the direct product of two cyclic groups of order 2.
Combining the previous two properties we see that every element of G can be written as a (positive) word in a, b, c, d such that this word does not contain any subwords of the form aa, bb, cc, dd, cd, dc, bc, cb, bd, db. Such words are called reduced.
The group G is a 2-group, that is, every element in G has finite order that is a power of 2.
The group G has intermediate growth.
The group G is amenable but not elementary amenable.
The group G is just infinite, that is G is infinite but every proper quotient group of G is finite.
The group G has the congruence subgroup property: a subgroup H has finite index in G if and only if there is a positive integer n such that 
The group G has solvable subgroup membership problem, that is, there is an algorithm that, given arbitrary words w, u1, ..., un decides whether or not w  represents an element of the subgroup generated by u1, ..., un.
The group G is subgroup separable, that is, every finitely generated subgroup is closed in the pro-finite topology on G.
Every maximal subgroup of G has finite index in G.
The group G is finitely generated but not finitely presentable.

 is a normal subgroup of index 2 in G and 

A reduced word represents an element of if and only if this word involves an even number of occurrences of a.
If w is a reduced word in G with a positive even number of occurrences of a, then there exist words u, v (not necessarily reduced) such that:

This is sometimes called the contraction property. It plays a key role in many proofs regarding G since it allows to use inductive arguments on the length of a word.
The group G has solvable word problem and solvable conjugacy problem (consequence of the contraction property).

See also
Geometric group theory
Growth of finitely generated groups
Amenable groups
Iterated monodromy group
Non-commutative cryptography

References

External links
Rostislav Grigorchuk and Igor Pak, Groups of Intermediate Growth: an Introduction for Beginners, preprint, 2006, arXiv

Group theory
Geometric group theory